Bittman is a surname. Notable people with the surname include:

Dan Bittman (born 1962), Romanian singer who represented the country at the Eurovision Song Contest 1994
Gregory Bittman, Canadian Roman Catholic bishop
Mark Bittman (born 1950), American journalist and food writer

See also
Lawrence Martin-Bittman (born 1931), American artist and writer
Red Bittmann (1862–1929), American baseball player